The Bishops' Conference of the Netherlands is a permanent body within the Roman Catholic Church in the Netherlands which determines policies and directs the apostolic mission within the Netherlands.  It is governed by bishops from around the country.

Description
The Dutch Catholic Church has an archbishopric and six suffragan dioceses under it as well as a Military Ordinariate. An archbishop stands alone at the head of the archdiocese, but he is not the "boss" of his fellow bishops or their dioceses. Each diocese has a bishop (ordinary) and some dioceses also have one or more auxiliary bishops.

If the diocese is sede vacante, then a diocesan administrator is designated. This does not necessarily have to be a bishop and sometimes is the vicar-general. If a non-bishop is diocesan administrator, he will attend meetings of the bishops' conference, but is not a voting member.

The apostolic nuncio usually attends meetings of the Bishops' Conference, but he is not a member of it because he is not a bishop of a diocese within the Netherlands. The nuncio represents the Holy See.

The Netherlands Bishops' Conference is usually chaired by a bishop with the highest rank, such as the Archbishop, but this is not mandatory. When Wim Eijk took offices as archbishop of Utrecht in 2008, he chose not to assume the presidency, in order to have more time for his work as archbishop. Therefore, Ad van Luyn was the President and Frans Wiertz the Vice-President (the two 'seniores "among the seven bishops).

Today Hans van den Hende is President and Jan Liesen is Vice-President.

Members of the Bishops' Conference
Wim Eijk, Cardinal, Archbishop of Utrecht
Jan Liesen, Bishop of Breda, Deputy Chairman
Ron van den Hout, Bishop of Groningen-Leeuwarden
Jos Punt, Bishop emeritus of Haarlem-Amsterdam and Military Bishop emeritus
Gerard de Korte, Bishop of 's-Hertogenbosch
Harrie Smeets, Bishop of Roermond
Frans Wiertz, Bishop emeritus of Roermond
Hans van den Hende, Bishop of Rotterdam, Chairman
Jan Hendriks, Bishop of Haarlem-Amsterdam
Rob Mutsaerts, Auxiliary Bishop of 's-Hertogenbosch
Everard de Jong, Auxiliary Bishop of Roermond
Ted Hoogenboom, Auxiliary Bishop of Utrecht
Herman Woorts, Auxiliary Bishop of Utrecht
Jan van Burgsteden, Auxiliary Bishop Emeritus of Haarlem-Amsterdam

Positions Within the Bishops' Conference

Policy Sectors

The Bishops Conference has established a nine policies which referent is still a bishop, assisted by a secretary.

Catechesis - Rob Mutsaerts
Categorical Chaplaincy - Everard de Jong
Communication and Media - Frans Wiertz
Interfaith dialogue - Jan van Burg Cities
Youth - Rob Mutsaerts
Church and Society - Gerard de Korte
Liturgy and Bible - Jan Liesen
Mission and Development - Jos Punt
Ecumenism - Hans van den Hende
Education - Jan Hendriks
Vocation and Training - Wim Eijk

Fields

In addition to the policies is a five thematic fields set, which is still a bishop referent.

Marriage and Family - Anthony Hurkmans
Relations with Judaism - Herman Woorts
Medical Ethics - Wim Eijk
Commission of the Bishops' Conferences of the European Community - Ted Hoogenboom
Council of the Bishops' Conferences of Europe - Wim Eijk

Contact Persons

Church and Elders - Gerard de Korte
New Movements - Jan van Burgsteden
Pilgrimages - Herman Woorts
Religious and Secular Institutes - Jan van Burg Cities
Women and the Church - Gerard de Korte

Former members

There are seven Emeritus Bishop. There are also other Dutch bishops that a non-Dutch diocese boards.

Secretariat

The Secretariat of the Bishops Conference and the Dutch Church Province is conducted by the Secretariat of the Roman Catholic Communion (SRKK). The Secretariat is headed by a Secretary-General. Since June 2, 2012 this has been Rev. Mr. (deacon) Hans Nijhuis.

Leaders of the Bishops' Conference

References

External links
 Netherlands Bishops' Conference page on RKKerk.nl
 RKKerk.nl Official website of the Roman Catholic Church of the Netherlands
 GCatholic.org page for the Netherlands

Neth
Catholic Church in the Netherlands